George Sidney Fisher (19 June 1925 – 30 August 2015) was an English footballer who played as a right-back in the Football League.

He signed his contract for Millwall F.C. in 1942 and played in the War Cup South Final at Wembley against Chelsea on 7 April 1945; the attendance at the game reached 90,000, which is the largest crowd Millwall have ever played in front of. He is the twin brother of former Millwall defender Jackie Fisher.

After leaving Colchester, he played for non-League clubs Bexleyheath & Welling, Romford and Aveley.

References

External links
 

1925 births
2015 deaths
English footballers
Footballers from Bermondsey
Association football defenders
English Football League players
Fulham F.C. players
Welling United F.C. players
Millwall F.C. players
Colchester United F.C. players
Bexley United F.C. players
Romford F.C. players
Aveley F.C. players
Twin sportspeople
English twins